The 2013 Ronde van Drenthe World Cup was the 7th running of the women's Ronde van Drenthe World Cup, a women's bicycle race in the Netherlands. It was the first World Cup race of the 2013 UCI Women's Road World Cup.

Marianne Vos rode away from the peloton on the VAM-Berg in the last lap. Later Ellen van Dijk was able to join her in her escape. A few metres before the finish line Vos outsprinted Van Dijk and won the race.

Results

Source

References

External links
  

Ronde van Drenthe (women's race)
Ronde van Drenthe World Cup
Ronde van Drenthe World Cup